Charles Lucien Jules Laurent Bonaparte, 2nd Prince of Canino and Musignano (24 May 1803 – 29 July 1857) was a French naturalist and ornithologist. Lucien and his wife had twelve children, including Cardinal Lucien Bonaparte.

Life and career
Bonaparte was the son of Lucien Bonaparte and Alexandrine de Bleschamp. Lucien was a younger brother of  Napoleon I, making Charles the emperor’s nephew. Born in Paris, he was raised in Italy. On 29 June 1822, he married his cousin, Zénaïde, in Brussels. Soon after the marriage, the couple left for Philadelphia in the United States to live with Zénaïde's father, Joseph Bonaparte (who was also the paternal uncle of Charles). Before leaving Italy, Charles had already discovered a warbler new to science, the moustached warbler, and on the voyage he collected specimens of a new storm-petrel. On arrival in the United States, he presented a paper on this new bird, which was later named after Alexander Wilson. 

Bonaparte then set about studying the ornithology of the United States and updating Wilson's Ornithology or History of the Birds of the United States. The revised edition was published between 1825 and 1833. His other publications included "Observations on the Nomenclature of Wilson's Ornithology" (in the Journal of the Philadelphia Academy) and "Synopsis of the Birds of the United States" (in the Annals of the Lyceum of New York). In 1824, Bonaparte tried to get the then unknown John James Audubon accepted by the Academy of Natural Sciences, but this was opposed by the ornithologist George Ord who disliked Audubon's dramatic bird poses and considered him to be "a back-country upstart who romanticized his subject matter," according to the Audubon Galleries.

At the end of 1826, Bonaparte and his family returned to Europe. He visited Germany, where he met Philipp Jakob Cretzschmar, and England, where he met John Edward Gray at the British Museum, and renewed his acquaintance with Audubon. In 1828, the family settled in Rome. In Italy, he was the originator of several scientific congresses, and lectured and wrote extensively on American and European ornithology and other branches of natural history. Between 1832 and 1841, Bonaparte published his work on the animals of Italy, Iconografia della Fauna Italica. He had also published Specchio Comparativo delle Ornithologie di Roma e di Filadelfia (Pisa, 1827), presenting a comparison between birds of the latitude of Philadelphia and Italian species. He created the genus Zenaida, after his wife, for the mourning dove and its relatives. He was elected a member of the American Antiquarian Society in 1845.

In 1840, he became Prince of Canino and Musignano after his father's death and became involved in politics, particularly the anti-Austrian party which he joined in 1848. He did not, however, lose interest in his favourite studies for he organized and presided over several scientific congresses in Italy.

In 1849, he was elected to the Roman Assembly and participated in the creation of the Roman Republic. According to Jasper Ridley, when the Assembly convened for the first time: "When the name of Carlo Bonaparte, who was a member for Viterbo, was called, he replied to the roll-call by calling out Long live the Republic!" (Viva la Repubblica!). He participated in the defense of Rome against the 40,000 French troops sent by his cousin Louis Napoleon. He left Rome after the Republican army was defeated in July 1849. He landed at Marseilles, but was ordered to leave the country by Louis Napoleon. He reaffirmed his political beliefs the following year in naming Wilson's bird-of-paradise (Cicinnurus respublica) in honor of the republican idea.

He travelled to the United Kingdom, attending the meeting of the British Association in Birmingham. He then visited Sir William Jardine in southern Scotland. Charles then began work on preparing a methodical classification of all the birds in the world, visiting museums across Europe to study the collections. In 1850, he was allowed to return to France and made Paris his home for the rest of his life. In 1854, he became director of the Jardin des Plantes. In 1855, he was made a foreign member of the Royal Swedish Academy of Sciences. He published the first volume of his Conspectus Generum Avium before his death, the second volume being edited by Hermann Schlegel.

Bonaparte also studied amphibians and reptiles, and is the author of Vipera ursinii, commonly known as Orsini's viper.

Bonaparte was extremely prolific and is responsible for coining Latin names for a large number of bird species. As of August 2019, in the online list of birds maintained by Frank Gill and David Donsker on behalf of the International Ornithological Committee (IOC), Bonaparte is credited as the authority for 165 genera, 203 species and 262 subspecies.

Lucien Charles Bonaparte died in Paris at age 54.

In the Luigi Magni's film In the Name of the Sovereign People (1990), Bonaparte is played by Carlo Croccolo.

Honours 
 1823: Member of the American Philosophical Society in Philadelphia.
1845: Member of the Royal Academy of Science, Letters and Fine Arts of Belgium.

Family
Prince Charles and Princess Zénaïde Bonaparte had twelve children, listed below:

Works
 American Ornithology, or, The Natural History of Birds Inhabiting the United States, not given by Wilson (4 vols., Philadelphia, 1825-1833). This work contains more than 100 new species discovered by Bonaparte.
 Conspectus Generum Avium (Leyden, 1850)
 Revue critique de l'ornithologie Européenne (Brussels, 1850)
 Monographie des loxiens (Leyden, 1850) in collaboration with H. Schlegel
 Catalogue des oiseaux d'Europe (Paris, 1856)
 Memoirs (New York, 1836)

In conjunction with M. de Pouancé, he also prepared descriptive catalogue of pigeons and one of parrots which were published after his death. Among his papers published are:
 “Observations on the Nomenclature of Wilson's ‘Ornithology,’” Journal of the Academy of Philadelphia
 “Synopsis of the Birds of the United States,” Annals of the Lyceum of New York
 “Catalogue of the Birds of the United States,” Contributions of the Maclurian Lyceum of Philadelphia

He published several scientific papers on ornithological topics in the Bolognese journal Nuovi annali delle scienze naturali, as Carlo Luciano Bonaparte.

See also
:Category:Taxa named by Charles Lucien Bonaparte
as Bonaparte described over 500 species.

Legacy
Several birds are named after him:
Bonaparte's gull - Chroicocephalus philadelphia
Bonaparte's nightjar - Caprimulgus concretus
Bonaparte's parakeet - Pyrrhura lucianii
Highland tinamou Nothocercus bonapartei
The Napoleon snake eel Ophichthus bonaparti, also known as the Napoleon Eel, the Purplebanded Snake Eel, or the Saddled snake-eel is named after him.

References

Further reading
 

 Mearns, Barbara and Richard - Biographies for Birdwatchers

External links

Zoologica Göttingen State and University Library

French ornithologists
French taxonomists
1803 births
1857 deaths
Charles Lucien Bonaparte
Members of the Royal Swedish Academy of Sciences
Members of the American Antiquarian Society
Members of the Royal Academy of Belgium
Charles Lucien
Charles Lucien Bonaparte
19th-century French zoologists
Scientists from Paris